ICF syndrome (or Immunodeficiency, Centromere instability and Facial anomalies syndrome) is a very rare autosomal recessive immune disorder.

Presentation
It is characterized by variable reductions in serum immunoglobulin (IgA) levels which cause most ICF patients to succumb to infectious diseases before adulthood. ICF syndrome patients exhibit facial anomalies which include hypertelorism, low-set ears, epicanthal folds and macroglossia. Other frequent symptoms observed in individuals with ICF syndrome include intellectual disability, recurrent and prolonged respiratory infections, and integumentary and digestive system infections.

Genetics

Mutations in four genes can cause this syndrome: Cell division cycle associated protein 7 (CDCA7), DNA-methyltransferase 3b (DNMT3B), Lymphoid specific helicase (HELLS) and Zinc finger- and BTB domain containing protein 24 (ZBTB24).

The CDCA7 gene is located on chromosome 2 (2q31.1).

The  DNMT3B gene is located on chromosome 20 (20q11.2)).

The HELLS gene is located on chromosome 10 (10q23.33)

The ZBTB24 gene is located on chromosome 6 (6q21)

This disease is inherited in an autosomal recessive manner.

Diagnosis
Diagnosis can occur using a karyotype or linkage analysis or DNA sequence analysis. This can occur prior to birth in families with a known history of the condition.

Treatment
For ICF patients the most diffused therapy consists of repeated intravenous infusions of immunoglobulins for the patients entire lifespan. In 2007, Gennery et al. cured the humoral and cellular immunological defect in three ICF1 patients by hematopoietic stem cell transplantation (HSCT). The only side effect was related to the development of autoimmune phenomena in two of them. This is the only documented case of restoring the immune conditions and growth improvement in these patients.

See also 
 Bare lymphocyte syndrome
 List of cutaneous conditions

References

External links 

 Orphanet Journal of Rare Diseases link to ICF syndrome 

Autosomal recessive disorders
Rare syndromes
IUIS-PID table 3 immunodeficiencies
Noninfectious immunodeficiency-related cutaneous conditions